Alain (II) de Coëtivy (8 November 1407 – 4 May 1474) was a prelate from a Breton noble family.  He was bishop of Avignon, Uzès, Nîmes and of Dol, titular cardinal of Santa Prassede, then cardinal-bishop of Palestrina and cardinal-bishop of Sabina.  Many sources mention him as the Cardinal of Avignon.

Alain de Coëtivy was born at Plounéventer, Léon. His mother was Catherine du Chastel, and her brother was Tanneguy du Chastel, soldier and favorite of Charles VII.

Career
canon of Le Léon, 5 July 1436 – 30 October 1437;
bishop of Avignon, 30 October 1437 – 1474, carrying out building works on the Petit Palais at Avignon;
46th bishop of Uzès, 1442 to 1445;
made cardinal in pectore by Pope Eugene IV, confirmed by Pope Nicholas V in January 1447;
made cardinal priest on the consistory of 20 December 1448;
made titular cardinal of Santa Prassede, 3 January 1449;
made honorary bishop of Nîmes on 1 April 1454, by transfer of a cousin, Jean du Châtel, to Carcassonne;
made bishop-administrator of Dol, 18 June 1456;
present at the papal conclave of 1464 which elected Pope Paul II;
as cardinal, made bishop of Palestrina on 7 June 1465, then of Sabina on 11 December 1472;
made (honorary?) abbot of the abbey of Redon in 1468.

He also held the benefices of the parish of Marsac, which he resigned at the request of Pierre II de Bretagne on 4 September 1451. It was he who created the parish of Saint-Yves-des-Bretons in Rome, with Pope Nicholas ceding Saint-André-de-Mortaraziis to the Breton nation, who reconsecrated it to their saint Yves.

He opposed Basilios Bessarion for his Greek background. He was sent as a pontifical legate to Charles VII, king of France, in 1456, charged by Pope Calixtus III with making Charles set out on a crusade against the Turks. He died in Rome, at his palace on Campo de' Fiori, on 3 May 1474, and was buried in Rome. His monument at Santa Prassede was executed by Andrea Bregno.

Sources
Cardinal creation dates according to: Cardinals of the Holy Roman Church

Bibliography
Albanès, Joseph Hyacinthe (completed, annotated and published by Chevalier Ulysse), Gallia christiana novissima. Histoire des archevêchés, évêques et abbayes de France d'après les documents authentiques recueillis dans les registres du Vatican et les archives locales.
Catel, Guillaume de, Histoire de Languedoc
Léon Ménard, Histoire de Languedoc
Germer-Durand Eugène, Le Prieuré et le Pont de Saint-Nicolas-de-Campagnac
De la Roque, Louis, Armorial de Languedoc
Joseph Vaissète, Histoire générale du Languedoc
Charvet, Georges, La première maison d'Uzès, étude historique et généalogique de la première maison d'Uzès suivi du catalogue analytique des évêques d'Uzès (Nîmes, edited by Lacour-Ollé, 2002 reissue)

1407 births
1474 deaths
Bishops of Avignon
Bishops of Dol
Bishops of Nîmes
Bishops of Uzès
15th-century French cardinals
Cardinal-bishops of Palestrina
Cardinal-bishops of Sabina